Markhu is a village in Makwanpur District in the Narayani Zone of southern Nepal. At the time of the 1991 Nepal census it had a population of 3137 people living in 581 individual households.

Formerly, Markhu was a village development committee (VDC), which were local-level administrative units. In 2017, the government of Nepal restructured local government in line with the 2015 constitution and VDCs were discontinued.

References

Populated places in Makwanpur District